Moussa Toure (born June 19, 1985 in Monrovia, Liberia) is a Liberian footballer, who currently plays for Minnesota Twin Stars.

Career
Toure appeared in 12 games for the Minnesota Twin Stars of the National Premier Soccer League in 2008, scoring five goals. In 2009, he was capped seven times by the Atlanta Blackhawks of the PDL, netting three goals. He was capped six times in 2010 for the Fort Lauderdale Schulz Academy for the PDL and scored three goals.

Toure signed to play with the Atlanta Silverbacks in the North American Soccer League on April 25, 2011. He received his first cap for the Silverbacks was on June 8, 2011 when he was subbed for Lucas Paulini in the 87'. Toure was released by Atlanta on November 7, 2011 and returned to the Minnesota Twin Stars.

Personal
His older brother, Ansu, played for the Silverbacks from 2007-2008.

References

External links
Atlanta Silverbacks bio

1985 births
Living people
Atlanta Silverbacks players
Liberian footballers
North American Soccer League players
Atlanta Blackhawks players
Floridians FC players
USL League Two players
National Premier Soccer League players
Expatriate soccer players in the United States
Sportspeople from Monrovia
Association football midfielders